Sir Guenter Heinz Treitel  (26 October 1928 – 14 June 2019) was a German-born English academic and Vinerian Professor of English Law.

Treitel was born in Berlin into a Jewish family, the son of a prominent lawyer, Theodor Treitel, and his wife, Hannah Lilly Levy. In March 1939, he came to England on the Kindertransport together with his older brother, Kurt Max Treitel, and sister Celia. Treitel was once described by Lord Steyn as "one of the most distinguished academic writers on the law of contract in the English speaking world", and has often been described as the leading authority on English contract law. He is the author of Treitel on the Law of Contract, a seminal work on English contract law.

Treitel retired as Vinerian Professor in 1997 and received a knighthood for services to law. Treitel had been a Fellow of All Souls College since 1979; he was previously a Fellow of Magdalen College from 1954 to 1979.

Footnotes

Knights Bachelor
Fellows of Magdalen College, Oxford
Alumni of Magdalen College, Oxford
Fellows of All Souls College, Oxford
Fellows of the British Academy
Kindertransport refugees
Lawyers awarded knighthoods
English legal scholars
English barristers
2019 deaths
1928 births
People educated at Kilburn Grammar School
Vinerian Professors of English Law
Naturalised citizens of the United Kingdom
Jewish emigrants from Nazi Germany to the United Kingdom
20th-century English lawyers